Sa'id Pasha al-Mufti (26 June 1898 – 25 March 1989) was the 9th Prime Minister of Jordan and a Jordanian political figure of Circassian origin. Said Pasha received Emir Abdullah with a few Jordanian Sheikhs, when he came to Jordan and was leading the Great Arab Revolt against the Ottoman rule.

Al-Mufti served three terms as the Prime Minister of Jordan between 14 April 1950 and 1 July 1956. Al-Mufti lived in Jabal Amman, an elite area of the capital Amman; his house became known for its architecture and was later dubbed Al-Mufti House.

Al-Mufti was an independent politician, serving in several governments as interior minister (1944–1945, 1948–1950, 1951–1953 and 1957). He was Minister of Finance in 1945. He served as the President of the Senate of Jordan from December 1956 to July 1963 and from November 1965 to November 1974.

In his honor a main street in the Sweifieh area of Amman was named "Sa'eed al-Mufti Street", where the Embassy of Bosnia and Herzegovina is located.

Honour

Foreign honour
  : Honorary Commander of the Order of the Defender of the Realm (1965)

References

External links
 Prime Ministry of Jordan website

1898 births
1989 deaths
People from Amman
Government ministers of Jordan
Transport ministers of Jordan
Interior ministers of Jordan
Finance ministers of Jordan
Economy ministers of Jordan
Trade ministers of Jordan
Agriculture ministers of Jordan
Deputy prime ministers of Jordan
State ministers of Jordan
Prime Ministers of Jordan
Jordanian people of Circassian descent
Presidents of the Senate of Jordan
Members of the House of Representatives (Jordan)